In Tongan mythology, or oral history, Ahoeitu is a son of the god Eitumātupua and a mortal woman, Ilaheva Vaepopua.  He became the first king of the Tui Tonga (Tonga king) dynasty in the early 10th century, dethroning the previous one with the same name but originating from the uanga (maggots) instead of divine; see Kohai, Koau, mo Momo.

Trip to the sky 
When Ahoeitu was growing up, his ceaseless curiosity about his paternal heritage was repudiated by his mother, with his habitual inquiries gradually wearing down her resolve. His mother, Ilaheva Va'epopua, was an earthly woman living in what is now Popua (called after her name), a suburb of the capital city, Nuku'alofa, and located near the large lagoon of Tongatapu. She was once the mistress of the sky-god, Tangaloa 'Eitumatupu'a, enjoying his affections and cohabitating with him when he visited the earth, an affair that led to the conception of 'Aho'eitu, prompting the sky-god to leave before his son was born. After years of constant queries, Ahoeitu's mother finally revealed to him the identity of his father. She directed him to the great toa tree, which the lad scaled, landing in his father's realm. He followed the path to which his mother had directed him, and found his father catching doves. Eitumātupua was moved to see his son, and invited him to his house for kava and food.

Sibling treachery and murder 
Afterwards, the god introduced him to his other sons, Ahoeitu's older half-brothers, who were the sons of celestial women. These other sons, who were also living in the sky, were at that moment playing sika-ulu-toa, a volley-throwing game with javelins  made from the wood of the toa (ironwood) tree. When his brothers were introduced to their half-blooded sibling, they grew extremely envious of him. Once they were left alone with 'Aho'eitu, they challenged their brother to join in the game, during which the boy was mortally wounded by one of his brothers' well-aimed javelins. The boy died, and his remains were cooked (some sources say they were not) and cannibalised by his gleeful siblings, who tossed his head into a hoi bush, making it poisonous ever since.

Resurrection 
Some time afterwards, Eitumātupua sent a woman to fetch Ahoeitu, but she returned with the message that the boy was not to be found. Noticing that the boy's head was missing, Eitumātupua sent a messenger to seek out the head and the bones. The contents were then stirred and the bowl covered with banana leaves, and then the process repeated a second and third time, when Ahoeitu suddenly sat up, body reconstituted and very much alive.

Resolution 
He and his brothers were then summoned into Eitumātupua's presence, where the god rebuked his elder sons for their treachery. He punished them by confining them to the sky, while Ahoeitu was sent back to the earth, with divine mandate to become the King of Tonga. The wicked half-brothers repented, and begged their father that they also be allowed to follow Ahoeitu onto the earth. Their father eventually relented, but stipulated that regardless of their divinity and seniority in age, they and their descendents were to serve Ahoeitu and his house forever.

Royal lineage 

From 'Aho'eitu, the Tu'i Tonga Dynasty that once reigned over Tonga and its historical territories is descended. Although the Tu'i Tonga title itself now lies defunct, the succession continues through the noble title of Kalaniuvalu as of 1865, when the last Tu'i Tonga, His Majesty Sanualio Laufilitonga, died, leaving his son, the Lord Kalaniuvalu (né Viliami Fatafehi-'o-Lapaha), as the successor to a disgraced legacy. The current sovereign of Tonga, HM Tupou VI, is directly descended from Laufilitonga through the latter's daughter, the Lady Lavinia Veiongo, who was Kalaniuvalu's twin sister, which accords the Tupou Dynasty with customary seniority over Kalaniuvalu and his descendants courtesy of the old Fahu System of Tongan kinship. Apart from this, the House of Tupou are also directly descended from 'Aho'eitu as the rightful successors of the Tu'i Kanokupolu lineage, which was a junior branch of the royal bloodline tasked with governing the rebellious Hihifo district of Tongatapu. In this regard, it can be reasoned that the Tu'i Tonga dynasty and its kingship are still extant, making it the second oldest surviving royal dynasty after the imperial Yamato dynasty of Japan.

'Aho'eitu's older brothers were:
 Talafale: he became the Tui Faleua (King [of the] Second House), a spare dynasty in case Ahoeitu's line would ever die out (which apparently has still not happened). He also became the Tui Pelehake (Favoured Ruler), another very high title. For years, Prince Fatafehi, brother to King Taufa'ahau Tupou IV, kept both titles, but after his death in 1999, only the Tui Pelehake title was inherited by his son, as the Tui Faleua title reverted to the Crown.
 Matakehe: his line became extinct during the reign of the Tui Tonga, Tuʻitātui. He, and his younger brother, the Tui Folaha, were the guardians of the Tui Tonga's person.
 Māliepō; his descendants are the matāpule, Lauaki, and the Kau Tufunga (Royal Undertakers).
 Tui Loloko: his line is still extant. He and his younger brother were to govern in the name of the king.
 Tui Folaha; his lineage came to end during the reign of the Tui Tonga, Tuʻitātui. Along with his brother, Matakehe, they were the guardians of the Tui Tonga's person, with the title ultimately having a bloodline directly connected to Houma, a village in the south-west of Tongatapu.

ʻAhoʻeitu has become the namesake for several other generations of his chiefly and royal descendants. The current king, Tupou VI, for instance, was baptised as Prince ʻAhoʻeitu ʻUnuakiʻotonga Tukuʻaho.

Samoan story of Tui Toga Aso'aitu (Tu'i Tonga 'Aho'eitu) 
According to Samoan legend, Aso'aitu (Aho’eitu in Samoan) was the first Tu’i Tonga (ruler of the south) and son of a deified Samoan high chief, Tangaloa ‘Eitumâtupu’a, and whose mother was a Tongan woman, Va’epopua, of great noble birth. This double origin, entitled the Tu’i Tonga to hold both divine and secular offices. For Samoa in particular, it was especially important to have these genealogical links in order for one's rule to be legitimized. This is seen again in later centuries during Queen Salamasina's time, as she was descended from this same line of both Samoan and Tongan aristocracy. In principle, the close cultural and historical interlinkages between Fiji, Samoa and Tonga were essentially elitist, involving the intermarriage between regional aristocratic families.

References 
 R.D. Craig, Dictionary of Polynesian Mythology (Greenwood Press: New York, 1989), 2–3;
 N. Rutherford, Friendly Islands: History of Tonga (Oxford University Press: Oxford, 1977), 27–8.
 E.W. Gifford; Tongan myths and tales, BPB Bulletin 8; 1924

External links 
 http://www.tongatapu.net.to/lore/tonga/tonga100.htm 

History of Tonga
Tongan chiefs
Tongan deities
10th-century Tongan people
Legendary Polynesian people